The Mimic is a British television series shown on Channel 4, starting 13 March 2013. The series centres on the fortunes of Martin Hurdle, an everyday maintenance man with an uncanny ability to mimic voices and stars Terry Mynott in the lead role.

Cast 
 Terry Mynott as Martin Hurdle
 Neil Maskell as Neil
 Jo Hartley as Jean
 Ami Metcalf as Helen Smith
 Jacob Anderson as Steve Coombes
 Sharon Duncan-Brewster as Dionne Coombes

External links 

Channel 4

2013 British television series debuts
2014 British television series endings
2010s British comedy television series
Channel 4 comedy
English-language television shows